The 2020 West Virginia Senate elections were held on November 3, 2020, as part of the biennial United States elections. Seventeen of the 34 West Virginia state senators stood for election. West Virginia Senate districts each have two elected representatives.

Retirements
Four incumbents did not run for re-election in 2020. Those incumbents are:

Republicans
District 10: Kenny Mann: Retiring

Democrats
District 7: Paul Hardesty: Retiring
District 13: Roman Prezioso: Retiring
District 17: Corey Palumbo: Retiring

Incumbents defeated

In primary elections
Three incumbents were defeated in the June 9 primaries, the same number as were defeated in the 2018 primaries. Senator Mitch Carmichael (R) was one of the three incumbents defeated. As president of the state Senate, Carmichael also served as the lieutenant governor of West Virginia.

Republicans
District 4: Mitch Carmichael lost renomination to Amy Nichole Grady.
District 9: Sue Cline lost renomination to David Stover.
District 11: John Pitsenbarger lost renomination to Robert Karnes.

In the general election

Democrat
District 12: Doug Facemire lost to Patrick Martin.

Predictions

Results summary

All results are certified by the Secretary of State of West Virginia.

Senate President Election 
On January 13, 2021, the West Virginia Senate convened to elect a President for the 85th Legislature. Republican leader and incumbent President Mitch Carmichael lost renomination, leaving the Presidency open to a new Senator. Senator Craig Blair was nominated by fellow 15th district member Charles Trump, and was seconded by Eric Tarr. On a motion of Senator Stephen Baldwin, nominations for the Presidency were closed, and Senator Blair was elected by acclamation to the office of Senate President.

Close races

Summary of results by State Senate District

Detailed results by State Senate District

District 1

Republican primary

Democratic primary

General election

District 2

Republican primary

Democratic primary

General election

District 3

Republican primary

Democratic primary

General election

District 4

Republican primary

Democratic primary

General election

District 5

District 6

District 7

District 8

District 9

District 10

District 11

District 12

District 13

District 14

District 15

District 16

District 17

References

External links
 
 
  (State affiliate of the U.S. League of Women Voters)
 

Senate
West Virginia Senate
West Virginia Senate elections